Katherine Alice Applegate (born October 9, 1956), known professionally as K. A. Applegate or Katherine Applegate, is an American young adult and children's fiction writer, best known as the author of the Animorphs, Remnants, Everworld, and other book series. She won the 2013 Newbery Medal for her 2012 children's novel The One and Only Ivan. Applegate's most popular books are science fiction, fantasy, and adventure novels. She won the Best New Children's Book Series Award in 1997 in Publishers Weekly.  Her book Home of the Brave has won several awards. She also wrote a chapter book series in 2008–09 called Roscoe Riley Rules.

Life and career 

Applegate was born in Ann Arbor, Michigan.  Since then, she has lived in Texas, Florida, California, Illinois, and North Carolina. After living in Pelago, Italy for a year, she moved back to Irvine, California. She got her start as a ghostwriter for Sweet Valley Twins. In 1997, she and her husband, Michael Grant, her co-author on many projects, including Animorphs and Everworld, had their first child, who has since come out as a transgender woman. In 2003, they adopted a daughter, Julia, from China. Following the end of Remnants, Applegate took three years off. Upon returning to writing, she wrote a picture book, Buffalo Storm, a middle reader novel, Home of the Brave, and an early chapters series, Roscoe Riley Rules, with HarperCollins. Home of the Brave won the SCBWI 2008 Golden Kite Award for Best Fiction, the Bank Street 2008 Josette Frank Award, and is a Judy Lopez Memorial Award honor book.

Applegate won the 2013 Newbery Medal for The One and Only Ivan, drawn by Patricia Castelao and published by HarperCollins. The annual award, granted by the American Library Association, recognizes the previous year's "most distinguished contribution to American literature for children." The story, based on the real-life Ivan the gorilla, is written from Ivan's viewpoint as he lives in a glass cage in a shopping mall. According to the award committee: "Applegate gives readers a unique and unforgettable gorilla's-eye-view of the world that challenges the way we look at animals and at ourselves."

Selected works

Picture books 
 Jack Rabbit and the Beanstalk  (1997)
 The Buffalo Storm  (2007)
Sometimes You Fly (2018) 
Ivan: A Gorilla's True Story (2020)

Animorphs series

Companion books
 Megamorphs 1: The Andalite's Gift (1997)
 Megamorphs 2: In the Time of Dinosaurs (1998)
 Megamorphs 3: Elfangor's Secret (1999)
 Megamorphs 4: Back to Before (2000)
 The Andalite Chronicles (1997)
 The Hork-Bajir Chronicles (1998)
 The Ellimist Chronicles (2000)
 Visser (2000)
 Alternamorphs 1: The First Journey (1999) (ghostwritten)
 Alternamorphs 2: The Next Passage (2000) (ghostwritten)

Everworld series

 Search for Senna (1999)
 Land of Loss (1999)
 Enter the Enchanted (1999)
 Realm of the Reaper (2000)
 Discover the Destroyer (2000)
 Fear the Fantastic (2000)
 Gateway to the Gods (2000)
 Brave the Betrayal (2000)
 Inside the Illusion (2000)
 Understand the Unknown (2000)
 Mystify the Magician (2001)
 Entertain the End (2001)

Remnants series 

 The Mayflower Project (2001)
 Destination Unknown (2001)
 Them (2001)
 Nowhere Land (2002)
 Mutation (2002)
 Breakdown (2002)
 Isolation (2002)
 Mother, May I? (2002)
 No Place Like Home (2002)
 Lost and Found (2003)
 Dream Storm (2003)
 Aftermath (2003)
 Survival (2003)
 Begin Again (2003)

Making Out series 

First edition publication dates are based upon the original publication when the series was titled Boyfriends/Girlfriends. Only the first eight books were written by Applegate. Books 9–28 were ghostwritten. The 28 books in this series are:
 Zoey Fools Around (1994)
 Jake Finds Out (1994)
 Nina Won't Tell (1994)
 Slater's In Love (1994)
 Claire Gets Caught (1994)
 What Zoey Saw (1994)
 Lucas Gets Hurt (1994)
 Aisha Goes Wild (1994)
 Zoey Plays Games (1996)
 Nina Shapes Up (1996)
 Ben Takes a Chance (1996)
 Claire Can't Lose (1996)
 Don't Tell Zoey (1996)
 Aaron Lets Go (1996)
 Who Loves Kate? (1996)
 Lara Gets Even (1996)
 Two-Timing Aisha (1996)
 Zoey Speaks Out (1996)
 Kate Finds Love (1997)
 Never Trust Lara (1997)
 Trouble with Aaron (1997)
 Always Loving Zoey (1997)
 Lara Gets Lucky (1997)
 Now Zoey's Alone (1997)
 Don't Forget Lara (1998)
 Zoey's Broken Heart (1998)
 Falling for Claire (1998)
 Zoey Comes Home (1998)

Ocean City/Making Waves series 
Originally published as Ocean City and republished as Making Waves, this series is unrelated to the Summer/Making Waves series below.

 Making Waves (1993)
 Tease (1993)
 Sweet (1993)
 Thrill (1993)
 Heat (1994)
 Heat Wave (1994)
 Bonfire (1994)
 Swept Away (1995)
 Shipwrecked (1995)
 Beach Party (1995)
 Forever (1995)

Summer series 
This series was originally published as Making Waves in the UK.
 June Dreams (1995)
 July's Promise (1995)
 August Magic (1995)
 Beaches, Boys, and Betrayal (1996)
 Sand, Surf, and Secrets (1996)
 Rays, Romance, and Rivalry (1996)
 Christmas Special Edition (1996)
 Spring Break Reunion (1996)

Roscoe Riley Rules series 
 Never Glue Your Friends to Chairs (2008)
 Never Swipe a Bully's Bear (2008)
 Don't Swap Your Sweater for a Dog (2008)
 Never Swim in Applesauce (2008)
 Don't Tap-Dance on Your Teacher (2009)
 Never Walk in Shoes That Talk (2009)
 Never Race a Runaway Pumpkin (2009)
 Don't Eat A Hula Hoop (2018)

Ivan & Friends series 

 The One and Only Ivan (2012)
 The One and Only Bob (2020)

Endling series 
 Endling #1: The Last (2018)
 Endling #2: The First (2019)
 Endling #3: The Only (2021)

Doggo and Pupper series 

 Doggo and Pupper (2021)
 Doggo and Pupper Save the World (2022)

Other books 

 The Story of Two American Generals: Benjamin O. Davis Jr. and Colin L. Powell (1991; nonfiction)
 Please Don't Go (1992)
 My Sister's Boyfriend (1992)
 The World's Best Jinx McGee (1992)
 The Unbelieveable Truth (1992)
 Disney's The Little Mermaid prequels (1994): King Triton, Beware!; The Haunted Palace; The Boyfriend Mix-Up
 Disney's Christmas With All the Trimmings: Original Stories and Crafts from Mickey Mouse and Friends (1994)
 Sharing Sam (1995)
 Tales from Agrabah: Seven Original Stories of Aladdin and Jasmine (1995)
 Listen to My Heart  (1996)
 Off Limits (2001)
 Home of the Brave  (2007)
 Eve & Adam (with Michael Grant)  (2013)
 Crenshaw (2015)
 Wishtree (2017)
 Willodeen (2021)
 Odder (2022)

Pseudonyms 
 L.E. Blair: Girl Talk novels
 Katherine Kendall (with Michael Grant): Harlequin romance novels
 Beth Kincaid: Silver Creek Riders series
 A.R. Plumb, and later, as Katherine Applegate: Disney's Aladdin series
 Pat Pollari: Barf-O-Rama series
 Nicholas Stephens: Disney's Enter If You Dare: Scary Tales from the Haunted Mansion (1995); Disney's Climb Aboard If You Dare: Stories from the Pirates of the Caribbean (1996)

References

External links
 
 

1956 births
American children's writers
American fantasy writers
American women novelists
Newbery Medal winners
People from Irvine, California
Women science fiction and fantasy writers
Novelists from Michigan
Writers from Ann Arbor, Michigan
Writers from California
20th-century American novelists
21st-century American novelists
20th-century American women writers
21st-century American women writers
Living people
American women children's writers
Women writers of young adult literature
American writers of young adult literature
Writers of young adult science fiction
American young adult novelists
Animorphs
Ghostwriters